The Auckland Exhibition, also known as the Auckland Industrial, Agricultural and Mining Exhibition, was a world's fair held in Auckland Domain, Auckland, New Zealand, in 1913 and 1914.

Opening

The Auckland Industrial, Agricultural and Mining Exhibition was opened on 1 December 1913 by its chairman, George Elliott, with the Prime Minister (William Massey) and mayor of Auckland (Peter Dignan) also in attendance. A message of welcome was read from King George VI. There were 18,000 attendees on the opening day, and the fair ran until 18 April 1914

Exhibits and entertainment
Buildings included a concert hall, art gallery, machinery court, palace of industries, and an exhibition tower. Entertainments in the fair's "Wonderland" included a water shute, tobaggons, a figure-8 railway and a tea room.

Postage stamps

Stamps were issued to mark the exhibition, but although the monarch was now George V, the stamps commemorating the event were overprints of Edward VII stamps. Few were sold, and forgeries are now common.

References

External links
 Auckland Industrial, Agricultural and Mining Exhibition (1913-1914) at the website of the National Library of New Zealand

World's fairs in New Zealand
History of New Zealand
History of Auckland
1913 in New Zealand
1914 in New Zealand
Culture in Auckland
1910s in Auckland
Festivals in Auckland
Auckland Domain